Radio Široki Brijeg or Radio postaja Široki Brijeg is a radio station, broadcasting from Široki Brijeg, Bosnia and Herzegovina on frequencies 92.7, 93.1 and 102.3 MHz. It serves the West Herzegovina Canton, Herzegovina-Neretva Canton and West Bosnia Canton.

It was founded on April 10, 1992. The station broadcasts from the Dom kulture (Cultural Home) at Gojko Šušak Square.

Staff
Director: Mario Marušić
Editor in chief: Mario Marušić
Reporters: Marinko Mikulić, Marinko Karačić 
Musical and technical: Valentino Zeljko, Predrag Rotim, Mario Naletilić  
Marketing: Mirjana Kožul

See also 
List of radio stations in Bosnia and Herzegovina

References

External links

 Communications Regulatory Agency of Bosnia and Herzegovina

Radio stations established in 1992
Radio stations in Bosnia and Herzegovina
Mass media in Široki Brijeg
Croatian-language radio stations